Boland Parchin (also Romanized as Boland Parchīn) is a village in Anguran Rural District, Anguran District, Mahneshan County, Zanjan Province, Iran. At the 2006 census, its population was 170, in 43 families.

References 

Populated places in Mahneshan County